Radford Meadows is a nature reserve of the Staffordshire Wildlife Trust, on the southern edge of Stafford, in Staffordshire, England. The reserve is a floodplain situated between the River Penk to the west, and the Staffordshire and Worcestershire Canal.

Description
Access is only along the towpath of the Staffordshire and Worcestershire Canal; the towpath is elevated, and provides views of the entire site.

It is part of the floodplain of the River Penk; it is important in absorbing excess water when there is high rainfall.

There are black poplars at the southern end of the reserve. The species is now rare in England, since there is less floodplain woodland. For several centuries, floodplains have been drained to provide more agricultural land.

To retain floodwater at Radford Meadows, dams have been installed. Shallow pools have been created to create conditions suitable for waders and wildfowl. If the right habitat is maintained,  birds such as lapwing and snipe may be encouraged to breed on the reserve, as they did up to the 1990s.

See also
 Floodplain restoration

References

External links
 Radford Meadows at Birdguides

Nature reserves in Staffordshire
Birdwatching sites in England
Wetlands of England